Millennium was a short lived film company from Roger Corman.

History
Corman sold New World Pictures in January 1983 for $16.9 million. Under the terms of the contract, he agreed to stay on as consultant for two years and that New World would distribute any movies he made until February 1984. He agreed to provide the company with a minimum of five films they could release. He set up a new production company, Millennium - the title of which was taken from the name of a 1981 retrospective of Corman's work at the National Film Theatre of London. He announced plans to make films budgeted between $2–5 million using cash from his sale of New World to finance. He wanted to make less commercial films. Millennium's films included Space Raiders, Love Letters, Screwballs and Suburbia (which he acquired).

Corman later formed his own company New Horizon Pictures.

Filmography
Space Raiders (1983)
Screwballs (1983)
Suburbia (1983) (a pick up)
Deathstalker (1983)
The Warrior and the Sorceress (1984) - this became a New Horizon Picture
Love Letters (1984)

References

Film production companies of the United States